San Rafael Airport or Tucupita Airport  is an airport serving Tucupita, the capital city of the state of Delta Amacuro in Venezuela.

The Tucupita non-directional beacon (Ident: TUC) is located on the field.

The runway is at the western end of Tucupita. Final approach to Runway 08 crosses the Caño Manamo River.

Airlines and destinations

See also
Transport in Venezuela
List of airports in Venezuela

References

External links
OurAirports – Tucupita
SkyVector – Tucupita
OpenStreetMap – San Rafael
 
 

Airports in Venezuela
Buildings and structures in Delta Amacuro
Buildings and structures in Tucupita